The 1984 United States presidential election debates were held during the 1984 presidential election. Three debates were held between Republican candidate, incumbent president Ronald Reagan and Democratic former vice president Walter Mondale, the major candidates. One debate was held with their vice presidential running mates, incumbent vice president George H. W. Bush and congresswoman Geraldine Ferraro.

Debate schedule

October 7: First presidential debate (Center for the Performing Arts) 

The first debate between president Ronald Reagan and former vice president Walter Mondale took place on Sunday, October 7, 1984 at the Center for the Performing Arts in Louisville, Kentucky. The debate was moderated by Barbara Walters of ABC News and featured a panel featuring James Wieghart of New York Daily News, Diane Sawyer of ABC News, and Fred Barnes of New Republic. The topics were economic and domestic policy issues.

October 11: Vice presidential debate (Pennsylvania Hall Civic Center) 
The vice presidential debate between vice president George H. W. Bush and congresswoman Geraldine Ferraro took place on Thursday, October 11, 1984 at the Pennsylvania Hall Civic Center in Philadelphia, Pennsylvania. The debate was moderated by Sander Vanocur of ABC News and featured a panel featuring John Mashek of U.S. News & World Report, Jack White of Time, Norma Quarles of NBC News, and Robert Boyd of Knight-Ridder Newspapers. The topics were domestic and foreign affairs.

The result was proclaimed mostly even by newspapers, television, other media, and historians.  Women voters tended to think Ferraro had won, while men, Bush.  Some media, however, either declared Bush or Ferraro the winner. The candidates were both praised for their ability to debate.

Bush, Ferraro experience exchange 
Ferraro handled a question about her experience at the debate, after being asked how her three House terms stacked up with Bush's two House terms, career as an ambassador to China and the United Nations, Director of Central Intelligence and four years as Vice President.  The peak of the experience battle came when, during a discussion of the Carter administration in Iran and the Reagan administration in Lebanon, Bush said, "Let me help you with the difference, Mrs. Ferraro, between Iran and the embassy in Lebanon."  Ferraro responded to cap what The New York Times termed "a bristling exchange", "Let me just say first of all, that I almost resent, Vice President Bush, your patronizing attitude that you have to teach me about foreign policy."

October 21: Second presidential debate (Music Hall, Municipal Auditorium) 
The second and final debate between president Ronald Reagan and former vice president Walter Mondale took place on Sunday, October 21, 1984 at the Music Hall, Municipal Auditors in Kansas City, Kansas. The debate was moderated by Edwin Newman, formerly of NBC News and featured a panel featuring Georgie Anne Geyer of Universal Press Syndicate, Marvin Kalb of NBC News, and Morton Kondracke of New Republic. The topics were defense and foreign policy issues. The debate is often seen as a victory for Reagan, most famously due to the line "I will not make age an issue of this campaign. I am not going to exploit, for political purposes, my opponent's youth and inexperience," it was received with laughter from the audience, and Mondale himself. Mondale later said that it was this moment when he realized he would lose the election.

References

External links 
Full video of the debate on C-SPAN

1984 United States presidential election
October 1984 events in the United States
1984 in Pennsylvania
1984